Agioi Theodoroi is a village of the Kozani municipality. Before the 2011 local government reform it was part of the municipality of Ellispontos. The 2011 census recorded 18 inhabitants in the village. Agioi Theodoroi is a part of the community of Polymylos.

See also
List of settlements in the Kozani regional unit

References

Populated places in Kozani (regional unit)